The  (developed under the codename "BA-X") is a fifth-generation home video game console released exclusively in Japan in 1994 at the initial price of ¥24,800. It was intended for a young audience and, like many consoles of the era (e.g. the LaserActive and the 3DO Interactive Multiplayer), was marketed more as a multimedia home entertainment system than as a dedicated gaming console, with anime quiz software and edutainment making up most of the game library.  The Playdia uses a single infrared joypad with simple controls. Bandai, the Playdia's manufacturer, was the only software publisher to support this console (except for VAP who published Ie Naki Ko - Suzu no Sentaku instead of Bandai).

Overview   
The Playdia was equipped with a CD-ROM drive, and the software was supplied on CD-ROM. The controller used two AAA batteries with a wireless method using infrared rays that could be stored in the main unit when not in use. The target age group was set mainly for elementary school students as both the hardware and software were inexpensive for home games at the time. 

The Playdia could create stunning anime-style Full Motion Video using CD-based games (FMV). The majority of the games were interactive learning experiences. However, Bandai did create a few video games with an interactive component based on their franchise series, including Gundam, Sailor Moon, Ultra Man, and Dragon Ball Z. The games, however, lacked true game action. As a simple interactive cartoon, the player just directs the on-screen figure by choosing from the menu options that are presented to them on the Playdia control pad. In addition, Playdia was the only 8-bit fifth-generation game machine, because the products of the competitors at that time were equipped with 32-bit CPUs and 64-bit CPUs across the board. The system had to rely on Bandai’s IPs which started to be redundant.  

On the main body and software package, there is a logo of "QIS" and the notation "This software is dedicated to the QIS standard" . QIS is an abbreviation of " Quick Interactive System" and indicates a high-speed access function to CD-ROM. There is no BIOS or menu when the user starts the console without a disc, all that shows is a blue screen. 

The Playdia had very poor sales, therefore for Bandai, the console was a failure. Bandai discontinued the console in 1996 and the unsold consoles were converted by Banpresto, a Bandai subsidiary, into coin-operated Micha King machines that played anime clips in Japanese arcades and shops. It successor was the unsuccessful Apple Pippin that Bandai co-developed.

Playdia title complete list

1994 (11 titles) 
 09/23 - Dragon Ball Z - Shin Saiyajin Zetsumetsu Keikaku Chikyū Hen - [BAPD-01]
 09/23 - Bishōjo Senshi Sailor Moon S - Quiz Taiketsu! Sailor Power Kesshū!! - [BAPD-02]
 09/23 - SD Gundam Daizukan - [BAPD-03]
 09/28 - Ultraman Powered - Kaijū Gekimetsu Sakusen - [BAPD-04]
 09/28 - Hello Kitty - Yume no Kuni Daibōken - [BAPD-05]
 11/25 - Aqua Adventure - Blue Lilty - [BAPD-06]
 11/25 - Newton museum - Kyōryū Nendaiki Zenpen - [BAPD-07]
 11/25 - Newton museum - Kyōryū Nendaiki Kōhen - [BAPD-08]
 12/08 - Shuppatsu! Dōbutsu Tankentai - [BAPD-09]
 12/16 - Ultra Seven - Chikyū Bōei Sakusen - [BAPD-10]
 12/16 - Dragon Ball Z - Shin Saiyajin Zetsumetsu Keikaku Uchū Hen - [BAPD-11]

1995 (16 titles)
 01/24 - Norimono Banzai!! - Kuruma Daishūgō!! - [BAPD-12]
 01/24 - Norimono Banzai!! - Densha Daishūgō!! - [BAPD-13]
 03/22 - Ie Naki Ko - Suzu no Sentaku - [VPRJ-09722]
 03/22 - Gamera - The Time Adventure - [BAPD-15]
 06/22 - Elements Voice Series vol.1 Mika Kanai - Wind&Breeze - [BAPD-18]
 06/22 - Elements Voice Series vol.2 Rica Fukami - Private Step - [BAPD-19]
 06/22 - Elements Voice Series vol.3 Aya Hisakawa - Forest Sways - [BAPD-20]
 07/28 - Bishōjo Senshi Sailor Moon SuperS - Sailor Moon to Hiragana Lesson! - [BAPD-21]
 07/28 - Ultraman - Hiragana Dai Sakusen - [BAPD-22]
 07/28 - Ultraman - Alphabet TV e Yōkoso - [BAPD-23]
 08/24 - Bishōjo Senshi Sailor Moon SS - Sailor Moon to Hajimete no Eigo - [BAPD-24]
 08/24 - Bishōjo Senshi Sailor Moon SS - Yōkoso! Sailor Yōchien - [BAPD-25]
 08/24 - Ultraman - Oide yo! Ultra Yōchien - [BAPD-26]
 10/20 - Chōgōkin Selections - [BKPD-01]
 11/16 - Elements Voice Series vol.4 Yuri Shiratori - Rainbow Harmony - [BKPD-02]
 12/15 - Soreike! Anpanman - Picnic de Obenkyō - [BAPD-27]

1996 (6 titles)
 03/22 - Ultraman - Sūji de Asobō Ultra Land - [BAPD-28]
 03/22 - Ultraman - Ultraman Chinō UP Dai Sakusen - [BAPD-29]
 03/27 - Elements Voice Series vol.5 Mariko Kouda - Welcome to the Marikotown! - [BKPD-03]
 04/24 - Nintama Rantarō - Gungun Nobiru Chinō Hen - [BKPD-04]
 05/15 - Nintama Rantarō - Hajimete Oboeru Chishiki Hen - [BKPD-05]
 06/26 - Gekisou Sentai Carranger - Tatakae! Hiragana Racer - [BKPD-06]

Not for sale (6 titles)
 Yumi to Tokoton Playdia - [BS-003]
 Go! Go! Ackman Planet - [BS-005]
 Jamp Gentei Special - 4 Dai Hero Battle Taizen - [BS-006]
 Bandai Item Collection 70 - [BS-007]
 Playdia IQ Kids - [BS-009]
 Kero Kero Keroppi - Uki Uki Party Land - [BS-010]

Internal details

 Sanyo Lc89515 - CD-ROM Host Interface
 Toshiba TA2035F - CD Focus tracking server
 Toshiba tc9263f - CD Single Chip processor
 Rohm 6398FP - 4 Channel BTL Driver for CD Player motor
 Toshiba TMP87C800F - 8 Bit Microcontroller (8 kb ROM, 16 kb RAM) - 8 MHz Operation, can access 64 kb (TLCS-870 series which is based heavily on the Z80)
 Sharp LH52B256 - 256 kb (32K x 8) Static RAM chip
 NEC μPD78214GC - 8 Bit Microcontroller (16 kb ROM, 512 byte RAM) - 12 MHz Operation, can access 1 mb (NEC 78K series)
 Toshiba TC514256JAJ - 256K Word x 4 Fast Page DRAM Chip
 Asahi Kasei AK8000 - Audio / Video processor
 Philips DA8772AH - Triple 8 bit DAC converter
 Sony CX1229M - NTSC/PAL Decoder
 Rohm BA10324AF - Quad Op Amp
 Sanyo LC78835K - 18BIT DAC with filter
 Rohm BU3052BCF - Dual 4 Channel Analogue Multiplexer

References

External links

 https://www.kanzenshuu.com/tidbits/saiya-jin-zetsumetsu-keikaku/
 Playdia TV advert

Bandai consoles
Home video game consoles
Fifth-generation video game consoles
Products introduced in 1994
Japan-only video game hardware
CD-ROM-based consoles